The 78th edition of the KNVB Cup (at the time called Amstel Cup) started on August 12, 1995. The final was played on May 16, 1996: PSV beat Sparta 5–2 and won the cup for the seventh time. A total of 60 clubs participated.

Teams
 All 18 participants of the Eredivisie 1995-96, four of which entering in the knock-out stage
 All 18 participants of the Eerste Divisie 1995-96
 22 teams from lower (amateur) leagues
 Two youth teams

Group stage
The matches of the group stage were played between August 12 and September 16, 1995. 56 clubs participated, 28 advanced to the next round.

E Eredivisie; 1 Eerste Divisie; A Amateur teams

Knock-out Stage

First round
The matches of the first knock-out round were played on November 28, 29 and 30, 1995. The four highest ranked Eredivisie clubs from last season entered the tournament this round.

E four Eredivisie entrants

Round of 16
The matches of the round of 16 were played on January 24, 1996.

Quarter finals
The quarter finals were played on February 28, 1996.

Semi-finals
The semi-finals were played on April 6, 1996.

Final

PSV would participate in the Cup Winners' Cup

See also
Eredivisie 1995-96
Eerste Divisie 1995-96

External links
 Results by Ronald Zwiers  

1995-96
1995–96 domestic association football cups
1995–96 in Dutch football